KDLC (97.7 FM, "Rock 97.7") is a classic rock radio station licensed to Dulac, Louisiana. It serves the Houma, Louisiana area and is owned by Coast Radio Group.

History
In 2011, KDLC signed in the air with an adult contemporary format branded as "Sunny 97.7".

On June 1, 2017, KDLC changed their format from adult contemporary (branded as "Sunny 97.7") to classic rock, branded as "Rock 97.7".

References

External links
Rock 97.7 Facebook

Classic rock radio stations in the United States
Radio stations in Louisiana
Radio stations established in 2013
2013 establishments in Louisiana